David Sydney Waterlow (18 December 1857 – 25 August 1924), was a British Liberal Party politician and businessman.

Background
He was born in Highgate, he was the fourth son of Sir Sydney Waterlow, a Liberal Member of Parliament. He was educated at Northampton and Lausanne. He married Edith Emma Maitland in 1883, and the couple had three daughters.

Career
He travelled round the world in 1879. He joined the firm of Waterlow and Sons, Ltd, printers, in 1880. He retired from the firm in 1898 but subsequently became chairman in 1922. He was the Director of the Improved Industrial Dwellings Company, Ltd, from 1885 to 1924. He was a member of the London County Council, sitting for North St Pancras for the Liberal backed Progressive Party, from 1898 to 1910. He sat as Liberal MP for Islington North from 1906 to December 1910.  

Waterlow remained active in politics: he was selected as Liberal prospective candidate for the parliamentary constituency of Mid Norfolk in 1912, but did not contest an election there. He also made two unsuccessful attempts to return to the London County Council: at Fulham in 1913 and Islington North in 1922.

He was Chairman of Governors at the United Westminster Schools in 1914. He became a Justice of the Peace in London in 1916. David Waterlow's sister, Mrs. Ruth Homan, was also politically active, being a member of the London School Board for Tower Hamlets.

He died at his home in Leatherhead, Surrey, in 1924, aged 66, following complications after surgery. He was buried at Brookwood Cemetery.

References

Sources
Craig, F. W. S. British Parliamentary Election Results 1885–1918,

External links 
 

1857 births
1924 deaths
Liberal Party (UK) MPs for English constituencies
UK MPs 1906–1910
UK MPs 1910
Members of London County Council
Burials at Brookwood Cemetery
People from Highgate
Progressive Party (London) politicians
Younger sons of baronets